Julius Jones may refer to:

 Julius Jones (American football) (born 1981), former American football running back
 Julius Jones (prisoner) (born 1980), American prisoner and former death row inmate in Oklahoma
 Julius Jones (baseball), American baseball player

See also
 Julio Jones (born 1989), American football wide receiver